Since the 1970s, there have been a number of adult film actors who have appeared in mainstream films with varying degrees of success. Adult film actors Marilyn Chambers and Linda Lovelace tried crossing over to mainstream careers in the 1970s, but had little success. Chambers did work with David Cronenberg in 1977's horror film Rabid, which went on to achieve cult success. Former adult film star Traci Lords appeared in John Waters' films Cry-Baby and Serial Mom, and Lords also appeared in the comedy film Zack and Miri Make a Porno. The gay pornographic star Johnny Hazzard more recently appeared in the mainstream gay drama Tiger Orange.

Jenna Jameson played a radio guest in the Howard Stern biopic Private Parts, while Sasha Grey was the female lead in The Girlfriend Experience. In 2013, James Deen played the male lead in The Canyons, an indie film written by Bret Easton Ellis, with Lindsay Lohan playing the female lead.

The following list is of pornographic actors who have appeared in non-pornographic films, including the year they first appeared in a mainstream film.

List

See also
 List of mainstream actors who have appeared in pornographic films

Notes

References

Mainstream films